Potassium voltage-gated channel subfamily A member 10 also known as Kv1.8 is a protein that in humans is encoded by the KCNA10 gene. The protein encoded by this gene is a voltage-gated potassium channel subunit.

References

Further reading

External links 
 
 

Ion channels